SM U-140 was a Type U 139 submarine that served in the Imperial German Navy in World War I.
U-140 was engaged in the naval warfare and took part in the First Battle of the Atlantic.

After the end of World War I, U-140 surrendered to the United States, which used her for testing. Finally, the United States Navy destroyer  sank her as a target in the Atlantic Ocean off Cape Charles, Virginia, on 22 July 1921.

Summary of raiding history

References

Notes

Citations

Bibliography

World War I submarines of Germany
1917 ships
U-boats commissioned in 1918
Ships built in Kiel
U-boats sunk in 1921
Maritime incidents in 1921
Ships sunk as targets
Shipwrecks of the Virginia coast
German Type U 139 submarines